The 1966 Arab Cup Final was a football match that took place on 10 April 1966, at the Al-Kashafa Stadium in Baghdad, Iraq, to determine the winner of the 1966 Arab Cup. Iraq defeated Syria 2–1 with two goals from Ismail Gorgis to Iraq and a goal from Nureddin Idlibi to Syria, to win their second Arab Cup.

Road to the final

Match

Details

References

External links
1966 Iraq - rsssf.com

F
1966
Nations
Nations
Iraq national football team matches
Syria national football team matches
International association football competitions hosted by Iraq
April 1966 sports events in Asia
20th century in Baghdad